Opera Grand is a skyscraper in Downtown Dubai, Dubai, United Arab Emirates. The developer of the project is Emaar Properties and it is designed by DP Architects.  The tower forms part of the new Opera District, its initial plan is for a tower with 65 to 70 floors of which 56 would be residential.

References

Residential skyscrapers in Dubai
Residential buildings completed in 2021